Jorge Martí Llumá (5 March 1930 – 22 December 1998) was a Spanish sailor. He competed in the 5.5 Metre event at the 1960 Summer Olympics.

References

External links
 

1930 births
1998 deaths
Spanish male sailors (sport)
Olympic sailors of Spain
Sailors at the 1960 Summer Olympics – 5.5 Metre
Sportspeople from Barcelona